Felix Chipota Mutati (born 29 January 1959) is a Zambian politician and leader of the Movement for Democratic Change party. Mutati did not run for a Member of Parliament seat in the 2021 Zambian general election and received a nominated seat by the president. As a nominated Member of Parliament, he was appointed Minister of Technology and Science on 17 September 2021 by the ruling Zambian President Hakainde Hichilema.

Previously Mutati served as Minister of Works and Supply from February 2018 to November 2018 under Edgar Lungu, Minister of Energy and Water Development from 2002 to 2004 under Levy Mwanawasa and Minister of Commerce, Trade and Industry from 2004 to 2011 under Rupiah Banda, and Minister of Finance from 2016 until 2018.

On 12 October 2020, Mutati left the Movement for Multi-Party Democracy and launched a new political party, the Movement for Democratic Change (MDC).

References

External links 
 Website of the National Assembly (Parliament) of Zambia

Living people
Members of the National Assembly of Zambia
Zambian Christians
1959 births
Finance Ministers of Zambia
Commerce, Trade and Industry ministers of Zambia
Zambian accountants
Works and Supply ministers of Zambia
Energy ministers of Zambia